Glenwood is an unincorporated area located within Vernon Township, in Sussex County, New Jersey, United States. The area is served as United States Postal Service ZIP Code 07418.

As of the 2000 United States Census, the population for ZIP Code Tabulation Area 07418 was 2,751.

References

External links

Census 2000 Fact Sheet for Zip Code Tabulation Area 07418 from the United States Census Bureau

Vernon Township, New Jersey
Unincorporated communities in Sussex County, New Jersey
Unincorporated communities in New Jersey